Life of Sorrow is an album by American mandolinist David Grisman. He offers a collection of bluegrass songs by Lester Flatt, Ralph Stanley, and others.

Track listing

Personnel
 David Grisman – mandolin, vocals
 Ralph Rinzler – mandolin
 Ronnie McCoury – mandolin, vocal
 Pat Enright – guitar, vocals
 John Nagy – guitar, vocals
 Del McCoury – guitar
 Artie Rose – guitar
 Ralph Stanley II – guitar
 Mac Wiseman – guitar, vocals
 Herb Pedersen – banjo, guitar, vocals
 John Hartford – banjo, vocals
 Ralph Stanley – banjo, vocals
 Rob McCoury – banjo
 Jason Carter – violin
 Stuart Duncan – violin
 James Price – violin
 Mike Bub – bass
 Jackie Cook – bass, vocals
 Jim Kerwin – bass
 Harriet Rose – bass

References

2003 albums
David Grisman albums
Acoustic Disc albums